Trichonius affinis is a species of beetle in the family Cerambycidae. It was described by Monne and Mermudes in 2008.

References

Acanthocinini
Beetles described in 2008